Maxim Leonidovich Voznesenskiy (Russian: Максим Леонидович Вознесенский) is an artist jeweller, art collector, creator of art projects, and promoter of Russian art.

Early life
Maxim Leonidovich Voznesenskiy was born in 1965 in the village Alol, Pskov Oblast, into an artistic family and his interest in jewellery design stemmed from a young age. His mother Svetlana Popova is a painter and having overcome the difficulties of being deaf and dumb she has made her way in the world of art. His father, Leonid Semyonovich Voznesenskiy is a doctor, biologist and a pharmacist. Maxim's great-grandfather on his mother’s side was a Bishop in the Russian Orthodox Church. Voznesenskiy graduated in Design at the Moscow Arts and Crafts School in 1983, specialising in jewellery. Between 1983-85 he completed his Military Service in the Soviet Army. He then studied at the Moscow Institute of Architecture for three years. In 1991 he graduated from the Faculty of Graphic Arts at the Moscow State Pedagogical University.

Personal life
In 1986 Voznesenskiy married the artist Natalia Intezarova in Moscow. Natalia graduated from the Surikov Moscow Art Institute in 1992 after studying under Tahir Salahov, academic and vice president of the Russian Academy of Arts. Natalia's father was the  artist Arkady Intezarov who died in 1979. From this marriage their daughter was born. In 1995 they divorced. Voznesenskiy married for a second time in 2000 to the artist jeweller Irina Dorofeeva. In 2006 she died after a serious illness. In 2012 Natalia and Maxim once again married each other in London.

Career
In 1992 Voznesenskiy became a member of the Artists Union of the USSR in Moscow. In 1998 Maxim Voznesenskiy together with Irina Dorofeyeva founded House of Jewellery "Jewellery Theatre". After her death Voznesenskiy went on to open a private boutique "Jewellery Theatre" as its owner and creative director, in Moscow on Kutuzovsky Prospect, and later in 2010 on Kuznetsky Most. Speaking to the New York Times, Voznesenskiy explained:

We are doing all we can to revive the traditions of Russian jewelry art and return it to the level it was at before the revolution ... Today, Jewellery Theatre is less a commercial enterprise than it is a cultural and educational organization.

He then moved to London to open the Maxim Voznesensky boutique on Old Bond Street together with his financial partner. Late in 2013 Maxim left the partnership and the boutique was renamed "Jewellery Theatre".

In 2014 he went on to found ART VIVID, for which he and Intezarova serve as directors. ART VIVID is a private collection which presents different artistic genres: jewellery, painting and sculpture.

In 2015 created his new brand, MAXIM V in London where he now lives and works. 2015 saw the launch of MAXIM V and his new collection VIVID TREASURES. by the Bentley & Skinner boutique in Piccadilly, jewellers by Royal Appointment to Her Majesty the Queen and His Royal Highness the Prince of Wales.

Collections
Maxim Voznesenskiy has designed over twenty individual collections of jewellery, and today his jewellery is represented in museums including the Kremlin Armoury, the Ekaterinburg Museum of Fine Arts, and in private collections in many parts of the world including Russia, Germany, Holland, Israel, France, Spain, Italy, Canada and the USA.

Exhibitions
During his career Voznesenskiy has curated exhibitions in Russia and in other countries. In 2001 he put together the exhibition ‘Diamonds of Russia – 20th Century’ in the Ivan the Great Bell Tower of the Moscow Kremlin Museum, together with the Alrosa Company and Gokhran - the State Fund of Precious Metals and Precious Stones of the Russian Federation. Featured in the exhibition was the collection: ‘The Diamond in The Russian Avant-garde’, which also included many other artist jewellers from Russia. In 2013, the entire collection, including eight pieces by Voznesenskiy of Jewellery Theatre, was gifted by the Alrosa Company to Kremlin Armoury Museum where it is now on permanent display.

In 2002 Voznesenskiy had a joint exhibition with American jewellery designer Lisa Vershbow at the All-Russia Museum of Decorative, Applied & Folk Art.
Each year between 2003 and 2010 Voznesenskiy exhibited his jewellery collections under the brand "Jewellery Theatre", at BaselWorld - The World Watch and Jewellery Show.

In 2008 he created the Art Project "The Representation of Beauty" to mark the 10th anniversary of the founding of "Jewellery Theatre" with a limited edition publication of the same name. The project consisted of a theatrical presentation of a series of photographs of women wearing his jewellery by the photographer Vladimir Klavijo-Telepnev and curated by the art critic Patimat Gamzatova.

Notable Works

The Moscow Kremlin Museum
In 2001 Voznesenskiy produced the White Triangle and the Black Triangle, which is now a permanent exhibit in the Kremlin Armoury.

Royal Connections
Interested in the work of Faberge, he created his first "egg" pendant over twenty years ago, and in 2004 Voznesenskiy, as creative director of "Jewellery Theatre", designed the wedding gift for the present King and Queen of Spain in the shape of a black and white pearl egg symbolising the union of marriage also inspired by the work of Faberge.

On the occasion of the Queen's Medal Concert at the Barbican (London) in 2012 Voznesenskiy designed a box, as if it were a theatrical stage with lighting which changes creating different times of day and seasons of the year. On the stage, looking at each other, stand a horse and a corgi dog made of silver with diamonds incrusted in the hoofs and paws, which was gifted by the London Symphony Orchestra to Queen Elizabeth II.

Miss Russia Crown
In 2010 Voznesenskiy designed a new crown for the Miss Russia contest, a crown symbolic of the historic ties between Byzantine art and ancient Russia.

Awards
In 1999 Voznesenskiy was awarded the "Diploma for Constructive Design" at the "Jeweller -99 International Exhibition" in Moscow for invention of the "heel", which allows the ring to stand upright. In 2002 he was awarded the "People of the Year Award" and in the same year his designs for "Jewellery Theatre" won the prize "Tahitian Pearl Trophy" at the International Jewellery Competition. In 2004 he won First prize "Golden Style" nomination at the "International Jewellery Moscow Exhibition" and prize for the Best Stand.

References

External links
 www.maximv.co.uk
 www.artvivid.co.uk
 Radio Interview (Russian) История успеха Максима Вознесенского. The Story of Maxim Voznesenskiy's success

Russian artists
1965 births
Living people
People from Pskov Oblast
Russian jewellers